Maria Cześnik (born 3 August 1977) is a Polish triathlete. She competed at the 2008 and 2012 Summer Olympics.

References

External links 
 

1977 births
Living people
Polish female triathletes
Olympic triathletes of Poland
Triathletes at the 2008 Summer Olympics
Triathletes at the 2012 Summer Olympics
Sportspeople from Warsaw
European Games competitors for Poland
Triathletes at the 2015 European Games
20th-century Polish women
21st-century Polish women